Ufton Lock is a degated lock on the Kennet and Avon Canal, between Padworth and Sulhamstead, Berkshire, England.

History 
It was engineered by John Blackwell, who had dug a new  cut to avoid the meandering River Kennet between Padworth and Sulhamstead. When the waterway was restored in the 1960s, restoring the shallow lock was deemed unpractical and instead the rebuilt Towney Lock was deepened to cater for the difference in level. The lock gates were removed, although the chamber masonry and bollards have been retained as a landing stage for the adjacent swing bridge.

The canal is now administered by the Canal & River Trust.

Footnotes

References

See also

Locks on the Kennet and Avon Canal

Locks on the Kennet and Avon Canal
Locks of Berkshire
Ufton Nervet